The Singareni Collieries Company Limited or SCCL is a government-owned-coal mining corporation in India.   It is under the ownership of Department of Energy, Government of Telangana. The Union Government's administration of the company is through the 49% ownership held by Ministry of Coal. SCCL is currently operating 45 mines where 20 opencast and 25 underground mines in 6 districts of Telangana (erstwhile 4 districts of AP) with a manpower around 45,079 as of Nov. 2020. SCCL is contributing 9.2% in the all India Domestic Production. Since inception (1889) 1.36 BT of Coal is extracted by SCCL and it has proved reserves of 10.84 BT.

History
In the year 1871, NIZAM's Ruled Dr.William King of the Geological Survey of India discovered coal near Yellandu in Khammam district and one of the important coal seams bore his name. He named the upper seam of the coal as Queen seam and the lower seam as King seam. The Hyderabad (Deccan) Company Limited incorporated in England acquired mining rights in 1886 to exploit coal found in Yellandu area. The present Company was incorporated on 23 December 1920 under the Hyderabad Companies Act as a public limited company with the name 'The Singareni Collieries Company Limited' (SCCL). It acquired all the assets and liabilities of the Hyderabad (Deccan) Co. Ltd. Best & Co., acted as Secretaries and Selling Agents. The State of Hyderabad purchased majority shares of the Company in 1945. From 1945 to 1949, the Hyderabad Construction Co., Ltd., was acting as Managing Agent. In 1949 this function was entrusted to Industrial Trust Fund by the then Government of Hyderabad. The controlling interest of the Company devolved on the Government of Andhra Pradesh in 1956 pursuant to the reorganization of States. Thus, the SCCL became a Government Company under the Companies Act in 1956.

It is named after the village Singareni in khammam district, Telangana where the coal mines are first noticed . The manner of extending financial assistance for expansion of SCCL by the Govt. of A.P., and the Govt. of India during V plan period was agreed upon in the Four party Agreement executed on 10 June 1974. Subsequently, the Govt. of India decided to control its equity directly in SCCL. Accordingly, agreement was concluded on 13 December 1977. The SCCL, the Government of A.P., the Government of India and Coal India Limited were parties to the agreement. These two agreements are popularly called quadripartite agreements.

For financial and other assistance during VI, VII, VIII, IX & X Plan periods, separate agreements were executed on 31 March 1985, 10 February 1989, 24 September 1994, 11 January 2002, 19 October 2004 and 11 June 2010 between the Government of India, the Government of Andhra Pradesh and SCCL. These agreements are called tripartite agreements.

The company's accredited function is to explore and exploit the coal deposits in the Godavari valley coalfield, which is the only repository of coal in South India. Mining activities of SCCL are presently spread over six districts of Telangana Viz., Komaram Bheem, Mancherial, Peddapalli district, Jayashankar Bhupalpalli, Bhadradri Kothagudem and Khammam Districts

The studies of Geological Survey of India attribute as much as 22,016 million tonnes of coal reserves in the Godavari valley coalfield.

The coal extracted by SCCL in the Godavari valley coalfield up to the year 2009-10 was about 929.11 million tonnes.

The Mile Stones of SCCL in introducing New Technologies 
SCCL is a pioneer in India in introduction of new technologies.

Production & Dispatch 
Coal Production, Coal dispatch and OB removal of SCCL

Coal Production Technology Wise

Coal Production in Grade-Wise 
More than 80% of SCCL coal production is between G9 to G17.

Coal off-take Sector Wise 
The SCCL mode of transport of coal is through Rail (NGSR)65%, MGR 15% (Merigold Rail), Road 19% and through Rope 1%.

Quality of Coal 
A 3rd party sampling: It is introduced from 28.07.2016 first with NTPC. The CIMFR is the third party agency all SCCL dispatch points and now presently it is implemented with all power consumers.

Washing of Coal: 3 washeries with 1MTPA capacity each in operation. Two more coal washeries with 7 MTPA total capacity are in pipeline.

Power Generation 
2 X 600 MW Singareni Thermal power Plant at Jaipur, Mancherial district

Unit-1 COD at 25.09.2016 and Unit-2 COD at 02.12.2016

New mines in near future 
SCCL is planning to open 14 mines (6 new Underground mines and 8 opencast mines) with a capacity addition of 52.37 MT in next 5 years.

New Mines opened 
New mines which are opened in past 5 Years

SCCL Future Targets 
SCCL has a vision for 2023–24 to reach:
 Production and Dispatches of 85.00 Metric Tons
 Over Burden Removal of 600 Million Cubic Meters
 Gross sales of Rs. 340 billion
 Profit of Rs. 25 billion
 Power generation of 2,500 Megawatts

Profit Sharing to miners 
SCCL offering profit share to miners, which began in 1999–2000 with 10% bonus.

Succession of Administrators

Awards and recognition
 India's Best Company Award
"Asia Pacific Entrepreneurship Award 2018" from Enterprise Award.
"National award for excellence in Cost Management in 2016 in Large Mining PSUs Division" from the institute of Cost Accounts of India.
"Golden Peacock Innovative Product/ Service Award 2015".
The Singareni Collieries Company Limited (SCCL) received the Indira Gandhi Vriksha Mitra Award - 2004 for outstanding contributions made in the field of afforestation and waste land development on 5 June 2007, at New Delhi.
Environmental Excellence award for 2005-06 from Society for Research and Initiatives for Sustainable Technologies and Institution (SRISTI), New Delhi.
Environmental excellence Award from Green Tech Foundation in 2005–06.
"Golden Peacock Innovation Management Award 2005" from the Institute of Directors, New Delhi.
"Golden Peacock Environment Management Award 2005" from World Environment Foundation, New Delhi.
"National Fly Ash Utilization Award 2005" jointly instituted by the Ministry of Environment and Forests, Power and Science and Technology, Government of India.
The Second Best Corporate Film Award 2005 by Public Relations Society of India, Hyderabad for "Shramika Bandham" a telefilm.
Three of the fourteen "National Safety Awards (Mines)" instituted by the Directorate General of Mines Safety, Government of India in 2004 (pertaining to 2001).
"Best Workers Welfare Activity Award" for 2003-04 by the Federation of Andhra Pradesh Chamber of Commerce and Industry (FAPCCI).
"Best Overall Performance Award" for 2002-03 by the Federation of Andhra Pradesh Chamber of Commerce and Industry (FAPCCI).
"Best Management Award" for 2001-02 by the Government of Andhra Pradesh.

Operations
The company is involved in coal extraction in Telangana, in the Pranahita-Godavari Valley region, which has significant coal reserves, estimated at 8.79 billion tonnes.
Ramagundam is one of the most important divisions of the Singareni Collieries Company. There are three divisions (RG-1, RG-2 and RG-3) and Adriyala project area in Ramagundam region. Each division is headed by a General Manager.

Singareni Collieries has established a thermal power plant of 1,200 MW (2 X 600 MW) in the town of Jaipur in the Srirampur region in Mancherial district.
There is a proposal to establish one more 800 MW unit at the Jaipur power plant.
SCCL has planned for a 300 MW Solar Power Plant for its captive use in its coal mining areas.

The Coal Mines Provident Fund Head Offices are located at Kothagudem, Ramagundam, Godavarikhani and Hyderabad, serving the needs of 4 regions.

See also
 Singareni Thermal Power Plant
List of trade unions in the Singareni coal fields

References

External links

Coal companies of India
State agencies of Telangana
Government-owned companies of India
Mining in Telangana
Energy in Telangana
Ministry of Coal
Bhadradri Kothagudem district